John Rathbone Ramsey (April 25, 1862 – April 10, 1933) was an American Republican Party politician who represented New Jersey's 6th congressional district in the United States House of Representatives from 1917 to 1921.

Ramsey was born in Wyckoff, New Jersey on April 25, 1862. He attended the public schools and a private school in Parkersburg, West Virginia, where he lived from 1872 to 1879. He studied law in Hackensack, New Jersey, and was admitted to the bar in 1883 and commenced practice in Hackensack. He was county clerk of Bergen County from 1895 to 1910 and was a delegate to the 1908 Republican National Convention. He was president of the Hackensack Brick Co. from 1909 to 1933 and was director of several banks. His wife was automotive pioneer Alice Huyler Ramsey.

Rathbone was elected as a Republican to the Sixty-fifth and Sixty-sixth Congresses, serving in office from March 4, 1917 to March 3, 1921, but was an unsuccessful candidate for renomination in 1920.

After leaving Congress, he resumed the manufacture of brick. Rathbone died in Hackensack on April 10, 1933, and was buried there in Hackensack Cemetery.

External links
 

John Rathbone Ramsey at The Political Graveyard

1862 births
1933 deaths
New Jersey lawyers
Politicians from Hackensack, New Jersey
People from Wyckoff, New Jersey
Republican Party members of the United States House of Representatives from New Jersey